Patrick Shawn McQuistan (born April 30, 1983) is a former American football offensive tackle in the National Football League for the Dallas Cowboys, Miami Dolphins, New Orleans Saints, Arizona Cardinals and Tennessee Titans. He played college football at Weber State University.

Early years
McQuistan attended and played football at Lebanon High School in Lebanon, Oregon, earning second-team All-Valley League honors as a junior defensive lineman. In his last year, he was moved to the offensive line and earned honorable-mention All-Valley League honors as an offensive tackle and punter.

College career
McQuistan accepted a football scholarship from Weber State University along with his brother Paul, but was declared academically ineligible in 2002. He played baseball as a pitcher for one season at Edmonds Community College. In 2003, he enrolled at Weber State and sat out the season as an academic redshirt.

As a junior in 2004, he played in 10 games as a backup offensive tackle and guard. He missed the season opener. The team finished with a 1–10 record. As a senior in 2005, he started 11 games at tackle. The team finished with a 6–5 record.

Professional career

Dallas Cowboys (first stint)
McQuistan was selected by the Dallas Cowboys in the seventh round (211th overall) of the 2006 NFL Draft. He made the team over the previous year starter Rob Petitti. As a rookie, he was declared inactive for the first 15 games of the season.

In 2008, he played mainly on special teams. The next year, he was inactive for the first nine games until Marc Colombo was lost for the season with a broken left fibula, he was activated for the remaining seven games, playing mainly on special teams and as a backup.

During his time with the team he was a backup offensive tackle and played special teams. He was traded to the Miami Dolphins in exchange for a conditional sixth round draft choice on September 3, 2010. The teams were going to switch 2011 sixth-round draft positions if the Dolphins had the worst record (and higher pick), eventually no exchange was made because that condition wasn't met.

Miami Dolphins
In 2010, he appeared in all 16 games with a career-high eight starts for the Miami Dolphins. At the end of the season his contract was due to expire, and the Dolphins chose to not re-sign him, releasing McQuistan to free agency.

Tennessee Titans (first stint)
On August 8, 2011, he signed with the Tennessee Titans and was released on September 2.

New Orleans Saints
McQuistan signed with the New Orleans Saints on September 27, 2011. He played in 10 regular season and 2 playoff games. His contributions came as a blocking tight end and on special teams.

Dallas Cowboys (second stint)
On June 8, 2012, McQuistan was signed by the Dallas Cowboys to provide depth for training camp practices, reuniting with the team for whom he played 3 seasons. He was cut on August 31.

Arizona Cardinals
On September 3, 2012, he was signed by the Arizona Cardinals after offensive linemen Levi Brown and Jeremy Bridges were lost for the season. He was waived on September 25 and later re-signed October 16. He played in 6 games (3 starts) at right guard.

Jacksonville Jaguars
The Jacksonville Jaguars signed him on August 6, 2013, the same team for whom his brother Paul played in 2009. He was released on August 30.

Tennessee Titans (second stint)
He signed with the Tennessee Titans on October 30, 2013. He was inactive in two games and was subsequently released on November 12.

Atlanta Falcons
On August 18, 2014, he was signed by the Atlanta Falcons for depth purposes after Sam Baker  was placed on the injured reserve list. He was released on August 29.

Personal life
His twin brother, Paul McQuistan, also played at Weber State University and in the National Football League.

References

1983 births
Living people
People from Lebanon, Oregon
Identical twins
American twins
Players of American football from Oregon
American football offensive tackles
Edmonds Tritons baseball players
Weber State Wildcats football players
Dallas Cowboys players
Miami Dolphins players
Tennessee Titans players
New Orleans Saints players
Arizona Cardinals players
Jacksonville Jaguars players
Atlanta Falcons players